Combs Ford is a suburb of Stowmarket in Suffolk, England. It sits at the confluence between the rivers Gipping and Rattlesden.

Combs Ford is where the procession of the Stowmarket Carnival changes as it swings between The Magpie and The Gladstone public houses and proceeds towards Ipswich Street.

It is held in popular local folklore that Dick Turpin once resided at the bottom of Poplar Hill near where the hairdressers on Poplar Hill is now.  He was barred from local public houses and had to travel into Stowmarket to drink in the Market Place.  Rumour also has it he left Combs Ford for a woman whom he loved. 
Combs Ford is home to a number of local characters.  Deejay Johnny Double is the local master of Hip Hop and is well known for his love of Hip Hop.   He is often heard playing to the locals at the bottom of Poplar Hill.

The Lord of The Ford, is another local who is renowned for clearing the River Rat at Boulders Bridge.

Another local celebrity is the legendary DJ Wyld. Who produces a Harder style of Dance music. And can be sometimes seen along Poplar Hill.

External links

 Stowmarket Sport (Grassroots coverage of sports, clubs and teams in a three-mile radius of Stowmarket)
 1st Combs Scout Group

Villages in Suffolk
Stowmarket